Nuevo México  is a corregimiento in Alanje District, Chiriquí Province, Panama. It was created by Law 41 of April 30, 2003. The name of the subdivision references both the country of Mexico and the U.S. state of New Mexico.

References

Corregimientos of Chiriquí Province